Sabana Grande de Boyá is a municipality (municipio) of the Monte Plata province in the Dominican Republic. It includes the municipal districts (distritos municipal) of Gonzalo and Majagual.

References 

Populated places in Monte Plata Province
Municipalities of the Dominican Republic